Hamed Abdel-Samad (Ḥāmid ʿAbd aṣ-Ṣamad, ; born 1 February 1972) is a German-Egyptian political scientist and author.

Life 
Abdel-Samad was born as the third of five children, the son of a Sunni Muslim imam. Abdel-Samad came to Germany in 1995 at the age of 23. He soon married a "rebellious, left-wing teacher with a penchant for mysticism" who was 18-years-older than himself. Abdel-Samad studied Japanese, English and French in Cairo as well as political science in Augsburg. He worked as a scholar in Erfurt and Braunschweig. In Japan, where he was involved with eastern spirituality, he met his second wife. He taught and conducted research until the end of 2009 at the Institute for Jewish History and Culture at the University of Munich; his dissertation topic was: Bild der Juden in ägyptischen Schulbüchern ("Image of the Jews in Egyptian textbooks”). Subsequently, he decided to become a full-time professional writer.

A member of the Muslim Brotherhood in his university days, a stay in a summer camp run by them triggered doubts, causing him to become skeptical, and finally become an atheist.

On 24 November 2013, Egyptian news websites (citing his brother Mahmoud) reported that Hamed Abdel-Samad had been kidnapped. It was then reported that he resurfaced on Wednesday 27 November 2013. His mother denied that he had been kidnapped.

Work 
Abdel-Samad became known to the German public through his book Mein Abschied vom Himmel (My Farewell from Heaven) (2009). Abdel-Samad said that the book was neither an attack on his culture, nor a call to abandon the Muslim faith. Rather, he just wanted to understand the contradictions of his own life. Following the book’s publication in Egypt, a group issued a fatwa threatening Abdel-Samad and he was put under police protection.

Abdel-Samad calls for an "Islam light" in Europe without shari'a, jihad, "gender apartheid", proselytism, and "entitlement mentality". He criticized the German political establishment for appeasing Islam, while ignoring fears about Islam. According to Abdel-Samad, this behavior created resentment in the German population.

Abdel-Samad participated in the 2nd German Islam Conference 2010-2013 held at the invitation of the German Federal Interior Minister Thomas de Maizière.

In autumn 2010, Abdel-Samad took the journalist Henryk M. Broder on a 30,000 km-long road trip through Germany for a five-part TV series.

In an interview aired on the Salafi Islamist Egyptian channel Al-Hafez on 7 June 2013 (as translated by MEMRI), hard-line Egyptian cleric and Al-Azhar professor Mahmoud Shaaban accused Abdel-Samad of committing "heresy", and stated that "he must be killed for being a heretic ... if he refuses to recant". Shaaban also stated that "after he has been confronted with the evidence, his killing is permitted if the [Egyptian] government does not do it."

In 2016, he was questioned by the Berlin police for alleged sedition. This was criticized as an attack on free speech by him and German-Israeli historian Michael Wolffsohn in the German newspaper Die Welt.

In his latest book, Islamic Fascism, Abdel-Samad describes Islam as a fascist ideology under the cover of a religion.

YouTube activities 
As of 12 January 2020, Abdel-Samad's official YouTube channel, Hamed.TV, had more than 140,000 subscribers and more than 29 million video views. The channel is almost entirely in Arabic (only 8 out of 264 uploads being in other languages).

Between May 2015 and April 2019, Abdel-Samad presented the weekly show Ṣundūq al-Islām ("Box of Islam"), in which he discussed various topics of Islamic religious history, as well as contemporary Muslim reality.

The channel was deleted by YouTube without comment on 17 June 2019, but due to numerous protests, the channel was restored soon after.

In September 2019, Abdel-Samad started a new show called Ṣundūq al-Insān ("Box of man", "Box of the human being"), which was intended to cover a wider scope of historical and social topics.

During Ramadan 2016 and 2017, Abdel-Samad appeared as a regular guest on the channel of Moroccan-born televangelist Rachid Hammami for the daily programme Āya wa-Taʿlīq ("Verse and comment"), where the two discussed Qur'an verses in a satirical manner.

Publications

In English translation
 Hamed Abdel-Samad: Islamic Fascism, Prometheus Books, New York 2016,

In German
 Hamed Abdel-Samad: Mohamed – Eine Abrechnung ("Muhammad – A final reckoning"), Droemer Knaur Verlag, Munich 2015, 
 Hamed Abdel-Samad: Krieg oder Frieden – Die arabische Revolution und die Zukunft des Westens ("War or peace – The Arab revolution and the future of the West"), Dromer Knaur Verlag, Munich 2011, 
 Hamed Abdel-Samad: Der Untergang der islamischen Welt – Eine Prognose ("The downfall of the Islamic world – A prognosis"), Droemer Knaur Verlag, Munich 2010, 
 Hamed Abdel-Samad: Mein Abschied vom Himmel – Aus dem Leben eines Muslims in Deutschland ("My farewell to heaven – From the life of a Muslim in Germany"), Droemer Knaur Verlag, Munich 2010,

References

External links 

  
 

Egyptian writers
Living people
1972 births
German male writers
Former Muslim critics of Islam
Egyptian former Muslims
German people of Egyptian descent
Ain Shams University alumni
People from Giza
Naturalized citizens of Germany
Egyptian emigrants to Germany
Egyptian atheists
German atheists
Former Muslims turned agnostics or atheists
German critics of Islam